This article contains a list of political coalitions in Italy.

Electoral coalitions

Active electoral coalitions

Centre-right coalition (1994–present)
Centre-left coalition (1996–present)

Defunct electoral coalitions

Centrist coalition (1953)
Pact for Italy (1994–1995)
Pole of Freedoms (1994–1995)
Pole of Good Government (1994–1995)
Alliance of Progressives (1994–1995)
Pact of Democrats (1995–1996)
Pole for Freedoms (1996–2000)
The Olive Tree (1995–2007)
The Union (2000–2008)
House of Freedoms (2004–2008)
Italy. Common Good (2012–2013)
With Monti for Italy (2012–2013)

Parliamentary coalitions

The Clover (1999–2000)
New Pole for Italy (2010–2012)

Government-only coalitions

National Liberation Committee (1943–1947)
Centrism (1947–1958)
Organic centre-left (1963–1976)
Historic Compromise (1978–1979)
Pentapartito (1981–1991)
Quadripartito (1991–1993)

Electoral joint lists

Active electoral joint lists

Democratic and Progressive Italy (2022)
Action – Italia Viva (2022)
Greens and Left Alliance (2022)
People's Union (2022)
Us Moderates (2022)
Life (2022)

Defunct electoral joint lists

National Bloc (1921)
National List (1924)
National Democratic Union (1946)
National Bloc of Freedom (1946)
Popular Democratic Front (1948)
Socialist Unity (1948)
National Bloc
Lega Lombarda – Alleanza Nord (1989)
Populars for Prodi (1996)
Dini List (1996)
National Alliance – Segni Pact (1999)
White Flower (2001)
The Sunflower (2001)
United in the Olive Tree (2004)
Social Alternative (2004, 2005 and 2006)
Christian Democracy for the Autonomies–New Italian Socialist Party (2006)
Rose in the Fist (2006)
Together with the Union (2006
The Left – The Rainbow (2008)
The Right – Tricolour Flame (2008)
For the Common Good (2008)
Left and Freedom (2009)
Anticapitalist and Communist List (2009)
The Autonomy (2009)
Civil Revolution (2013)
New Centre-Right – Union of the Centre (2014)
The Other Europe (2014)
European Greens – Green Italia (2014)
European Choice (2014)
Free and Equal (2018)
Together (2018)
Popular Civic List (2018)
Italy for the Italians (2018)
The Left (2019)
Civic Commitment (2022)
Sovereign and Popular Italy (2022)

Other coalitions and federations of parties

Unified Socialist Party (1966–1969)
Pact for Autonomies (2006–2008)
Republicans, Liberals, Reformers (2007–2008)
Federation of the Left (2009–2015)
Ecologists and Civic Networks (2011–2013)
Movement for National Alliance (2013–2014)

Regional electoral coalitions and joint lists

Deutscher Verband (South Tyrol – 1919, 1921, 1924)
Republican Progressive Democratic Front (Aosta Valley – 1946)
Aosta Valley (Aosta Valley – 1992, 1994, 1996, 2001, 2006, 2008, 2013, 2018 and 2022)
Reformist Popular Centre (Friuli-Venezia Giulia – 1998)
Together for Veneto (Veneto – 2000)
Autonomy Liberty Democracy (Aosta Valley – 2006, 2008, 2013)
Independence We Veneto (Veneto – 2015)
For All (Aosta Valley – 2018)
Autonomies for Europe (Aosta Valley – 2019)

See also
List of political parties in Italy

References 

Italy